Lucyna fenestella is a moth in the family Depressariidae. It was described by Philipp Christoph Zeller in 1874. It is found in Chile.

References

Moths described in 1874
Depressariinae
Endemic fauna of Chile